Vasile Bumacov (born 1 January 1957) is a Moldovan politician who served as Minister of Agriculture and Food Industry of Moldova in the Second Vlad Filat Cabinet from January 14, 2011 until February 18, 2015, after replacing Valeriu Cosarciuc (2009–2011) and it was succeeded by Ion Sula (2015–2016). He served also as the First Deputy Minister of Agriculture and Food Industry (1999–2001, 2009–2010). Since 2004, he has been a member of the Assembly of the Moldovan Academy of Sciences.

He commenced his diplomatic career as ambassador to Japan on January 27, 2016, and presented his credentials to Emperor Akihito, current Emperor Emeritus Akihito, at the Tokyo Imperial Palace on April 18 of the same year. Ambassador Bumacov had fulfilled his diplomatic obligations to Japan until July 31, 2020, when the Cabinet of Moldova accepted his appointment as ambassador to South Korea.

References

External links 
 Bumacov Vasile, doctor habilitatus degree
 Concise biographies of members of new moldovan government

 

1957 births
Living people
Liberal Democratic Party of Moldova politicians
Moldovan Ministers of Agriculture
Ambassadors of Moldova to Japan
Ambassadors of Moldova to South Korea
People from Ocnița District
Recipients of the Order of Honour (Moldova)